Every Day is a New Life is an album by Arto Tunçboyacıyan released in 2000 under the Living Music label.

Track listing
"Broken Arm" - 7:08
"Take My Pain Away" - 6:20
"Thank God I Wake Up Again" - 4:58
"I Miss You Every Moment My Brother" - 6:53
"Mystical Pine Tree" - 2:22
"Wooden Leg Grandpa" - 5:55
"Simple Message" - 3:18
"After the Game" - 4:30
"Dear My Friend Onno" - 5:44
"Baby Elephant" - 4:21
"Heaven for My Father" - 6:27

Personnel
Joanie Madden - whistle (human)
Arto Tunçboyacıyan - percussion, arranger, main performer, producer, sazabo, duduk, vocals
Dixon VanWinkle - tuba, associate producer, mastering, mixing, engineer
Paul Winter - consort sax (soprano), executive producer
Jim Butler - production assistant
Randy Weyant  - design
Eugene Friesen - cello
Peter Herbert  - bass
Marvin Stamm - trumpet

References

Arto Tunçboyacıyan albums
2000 albums
Living Music albums